Selle Italia–Eurocar was an Italian professional road cycling team that existed in 1990 and 1991.

Major victories
1990
 Giro del Friuli, Leonardo Sierra
 Stage 17 Giro d'Italia, Leonardo Sierra
1991
 Giro del Lazio, Andrea Tafi
 Giro del Trentino, Leonardo Sierra

References

Defunct cycling teams based in Italy
Cycling teams based in Italy
Cycling teams established in 1990
Cycling teams disestablished in 1991